The Gypsy Moths is a 1969 American drama film, based on the 1955 novel of the same name by James Drought and directed by John Frankenheimer. The film tells the story of three barnstorming skydivers and their effect on a Midwestern American town, focusing on the differences in values between the town folk and the hard-living skydivers.

The Gypsy Moths stars Burt Lancaster and Deborah Kerr. The film also features Gene Hackman; and Bonnie Bedelia in her first film role. Kerr had worked previously with Lancaster in From Here to Eternity (1953) and Separate Tables (1958). The film had the only nude love scene in her film career.

Elmer Bernstein composed the score.

Plot
A skydiving team called the Gypsy Moths visits a small town in Kansas to put on a show for the Fourth of July weekend. Their leader, Mike Rettig (Burt Lancaster), is accompanied by his partners, Joe Browdy (Gene Hackman) and Malcolm Webson (Scott Wilson).

The skydivers stay at the home of Malcolm's uncle and aunt, John and Elizabeth Brandon (William Windom and  Deborah Kerr). Distractions begin almost immediately when Mike becomes romantically involved with Elizabeth and her husband overhears them making love in their home. Malcolm falls for local student Annie Burke (Bonnie Bedelia), a boarder in the Brandon house, while Joe takes an interest in a topless dancer.

Mike eventually asks Elizabeth to leave town with him, but she declines. During the next skydiving exhibition, Mike performs a spectacular "cape jump" stunt but fails to pull the ripcord, intentionally falling to his death.  Although nobody wants to discuss it, they suspect that he committed suicide.  That night, Annie consoles Malcolm, and they make love.  Before the team leaves for good, they have to bury Mike. To pay for the funeral, Malcolm does the same stunt that killed Mike.  He leaves by train that night, without attending Mike's funeral.

Cast

 Burt Lancaster as Mike Rettig
 Deborah Kerr as Elizabeth Brandon
 Gene Hackman as Joe Browdy
 Scott Wilson as Malcolm Webson
 William Windom as John Brandon
 Bonnie Bedelia as Annie Burke
 Sheree North as the Waitress
 Carl Reindel as Pilot
 Ford Rainey as Stand owner
 John Napier as Dick Donford

Production
James William Drought's 1955 novel, The Gypsy Moths – A Fable, was originally acquired by Kirk Douglas and Edward Lewis' film production company Douglas and Lewis Productions in April 1966. The plan was for Douglas to play the lead and the partners immediately hired David Heilweil to write the screenplay. John Frankenheimer, who had been directing and co-producing films in partnership with Douglas and Lewis since 1962 through his own film production company, John Frankenheimer Productions, was to direct the film from the start.

After Douglas and Lewis broke off their partnership in December 1966 (after eleven years of working together), Lewis formed his own film production company, Edward Lewis Productions, and took with him several of the properties that he had acquired and developed with Frankenheimer. In January 1967, Lewis and Frankenheimer announced that they had together signed a four-picture financing and distribution deal with Metro-Goldwyn-Mayer, for a co-production deal between Edward Lewis Productions and John Frankenheimer Productions, including The Gypsy Moths. The screenplay had been re-written by William Hanley and the film was to be co-produced by Hal Landers and Bobby Roberts (who formed their own film production company Landers-Roberts Productions), directed by Frankenheimer and with Lewis functioning as executive producer.

In September 1967, Burt Lancaster was announced as the lead and the film was scheduled to be filmed in the Midwest starting in May 1968. John Phillip Law was originally in the cast, but Scott Wilson replaced him after Law broke his wrist.

The aerial sequences in The Gypsy Moths were filmed at locations in and around Benton, Kansas, with a Howard DGA-15 (N22418) used as the jump ship, flown by David Llorente and Larry Perkins.  After decoding the "DGA" designation of the aircraft, Browdy (Gene Hackman) jokes that "You're much better off jumping out of it, than taking a chance on landing it." 

At the time, the sport of skydiving was in its infancy, yet the film featured an extreme variation of the sport, the use of "batwings", a precursor to modern wingsuit flying. Jerry Rouillard was a key technical advisor and stunt double for Lancaster. Carl Boenish and Jay Gifford were responsible for the aerial photography, including photographing the jumps with a 35 mm camera mounted on their helmets, while they jumped with the stunt doubles, a team of a half dozen skydivers; Mike Milts, Garth Taggart, Russ Benefiel, Dave Thompson, Bill Ledbetter and Jerry Rouillard.

Reception
The Gypsy Moths ran in limited release in the U.S., with few theaters giving it extended showings. Frankenheimer was depressed and felt that a recent management change at Metro-Goldwyn-Mayer resulted in the film only being partially re-edited "so it could debut at family-friendly Radio City Music Hall, where it promptly bombed. Only in Hollywood could dealing with clueless studio executives be more frightening than jumping out of an airplane into free fall."

In his review for The New York Times, Vincent Canby noted that The Gypsy Moths had the semblance of an "action film," but "if this were a real action movie, I would be required to do little except look up at the sky and squint. Unfortunately, there isn't that much skydiving."

After its initial showings, the film was lengthened to 110 minutes and the rating changed to M for mature audiences. This rating was an early version of the later PG. As soon as it appeared, The Gypsy Moths disappeared. Director Frankenheimer claimed the film did not get the same attention as his thrillers, like Seconds (1966) and The Manchurian Candidate (1962). Despite this, he would call The Gypsy Moths one of his two favorite films.

The Gypsy Moths  was widely seen in Australia, with a local skydiving fraternity quick to seize the opportunity to promote their sport, showing a 16 mm print at many club meetings.

See also
 List of American films of 1969

References

Notes

Bibliography

 Armstrong, Stephen B. John Frankenheimer: Interviews, Essays, and Profiles. Washington D.C.: Rowman & Littlefield, 2013. .
 Bushell, Sue J. "Some Damn Good Airplanes". Air Enthusiast, Thirty-two, December 1986-April 1987. Bromley, UK: Pilot Press, pp. 32–44.
 Capua, Michelangelo. Deborah Kerr: A Biography. Jefferson, North Carolina: McFarland & Company, 2010. .
 Champlin, Charles. John Frankenheimer: A Conversation with Charles Champlin. Ashland, Oregon: Riverwood Press, 1995. ,
 Rouillard, Jerry.  "Will the REAL 'Gypsy Moths' Please Stand Up?," Parachutist magazine, November 1969, pp. 10–12.

External links
 
 
 
 
 
 

1969 films
1969 drama films
American aviation films
American drama films
1960s English-language films
Films scored by Elmer Bernstein
Films based on American novels
Films directed by John Frankenheimer
Films set in Kansas
Films shot in Kansas
Independence Day (United States) films
Metro-Goldwyn-Mayer films
Skydiving in fiction
Films produced by Bobby Roberts (film producer)
1960s American films